Olyras is a genus of clearwing (ithomiine) butterflies, named by Henry Doubleday in 1847. They are in the brush-footed butterfly family, Nymphalidae.

Species
Arranged alphabetically:
Olyras crathis Doubleday, [1847]
Olyras insignis Salvin, 1869
Olyras theon Bates, 1866 – rusty ticlear

References 

Ithomiini
Nymphalidae of South America
Nymphalidae genera
Taxa named by Henry Doubleday